Doamna Ghica Plaza (Romfelt Plaza) is a large residential building complex located in Bucharest, Romania.

References

External links
 

Residential skyscrapers in Bucharest